Rugby union in Finland is a minor but growing sport. With both Men's and Women's 15's teams are represented in world rankings and both Women and Men's Sevens teams competing internationally.

Finland Men's 15's team is currently ranked 86th out of 105 by World Rugby.

Finland Women's 15's team is currently ranked 47th out of 56 by World Rugby.

Governing body 
The governing body is the Finnish Rugby Federation (Suomen Rugbyliitto) (:

History 
Finland was the last of the major Nordic countries to take up rugby. Both Denmark and Sweden started playing rugby in the 20th century, and more recently Norway in the 1980s and 1990s. Neighbouring Russia and to a lesser extent Estonia started playing within the Soviet Era, during the 1950s and 60s.

Finnish rugby started to grow during the 1990s, and early 21st century. There are now 692 players registered with the SRL.

Teams
Currently Finland fields four national teams.  Men 15's & 7's, Women's 15's & 7's.

Domestic competition
A competition exists in Finland where climatic conditions dictate the main 15 a side season being played during the northern summer. Women play 7s on artificial grass from January to May.

See also 
 Finland national rugby union team
 Finland women's national rugby union team (sevens)
 Finland women's national rugby union team

References

External links
 World Rugby Finland page 
 official union page 
 Rugby Europe Finland page
 Helsinki RFC
 Jyväskylä Rugby Club
 Tampere Rugby Club
 Turku Eagles
 Warriors Rugby Helsinki
 Vaasa
 Hämeenlinna Rugby
 Espoo Rugby
 Kuopio Rugby
 Joensuu Rugby
 Saimaa Sharks Rugby
 Porvoo Rugby
 Kalev Tallinn Rugby
 Pori Rugby
 Seinäjoki Rugby
 Oulu Rugby
  Tervetuloa Suomen Pyörätuolirugby-sivuille (Wheelchair rugby)
 Archives du Rugby: Finlande